Chauncey L. Berrien (July 23, 1879 – April 22, 1932) was an American football player and coach. He served as the head football coach at Hamilton College in Clinton, New York in 1902 and at DePauw University in Greencastle, Indiana in 1903, compiling a career college football coaching record of 6–8–2. Berrien played college football at Columbia University, where he starred as a fullback.

Head coaching record

References

External links
 

1879 births
1932 deaths
American football fullbacks
Columbia Lions football players
DePauw Tigers football coaches
Hamilton Continentals football coaches
People from Galesburg, Illinois
Players of American football from Illinois